Mounts is an unincorporated community in Gibson County, Indiana, in the United States.

History
Mounts was founded in about 1880. It was a whistle stop on the railroad. A post office was established at Mounts in 1886, and remained in operation until it was discontinued in 1919.

References

Unincorporated communities in Gibson County, Indiana
Unincorporated communities in Indiana